Borongan Airport  is an airport serving the general area of Borongan, the capital of the province of Eastern Samar, located in the province of Eastern Samar in the Philippines. It is classified as a community airport by the Civil Aviation Authority of the Philippines, an attached agency of the Department of Transportation that is responsible for the operations of not only this airport but also of all other airports in the Philippines except the major international airports.

Airlines and destination

References

External links

Airports in the Philippines
Buildings and structures in Eastern Samar
Borongan